HMS Grafton was a 70-gun third-rate ship of the line of the Royal Navy, built at Portsmouth Dockyard to the draught specified by the 1745 Establishment, and launched on 29 March 1750. The ship served in the failed Louisbourg Expedition (1757).

Naval career
Grafton was commissioned in February 1755 under Captain Charles Holmes, in the months immediately before the commencement of the Seven Years' War. On 11 May 1755 she was assigned as a reinforcement for the British fleet commanded by Admiral Edward Boscawen, and sailed for North America when war was formally declared in 1756.

Grafton served until 1767, when she was sold out of the Navy.

References

Bibliography

External links
 

Ships of the line of the Royal Navy
1750 ships